G14 or G-14 may refer to:

Vehicles

Aircraft 
 Chase YCG-14, an American assault glider
 Messerschmitt Bf 109G-14, a German fighter aircraft

Surface vehicles 
 BMW 8 Series (G14), an automobile
 GER Class G14, a British 2-4-0 steam locomotive class
 LSWR G14 class, a British 4-6-0 steam locomotive class

Ships 
 , an Auk-class minesweeper of the Mexican Navy
 , a G-class submarine of the Royal Navy
 , an M-class destroyer of the Royal Navy

Other uses 
 G-14, a former organisation of European football clubs
 G14 (nations), a proposed plan that will put 6 emerging economies in the G8+5 group
 County Route G14 (California)
 February 14th Group, a political alliance in Burkina Faso